Renger van der Zande (born 16 February 1986) is a Dutch racing driver who currently competes in the IMSA WeatherTech SportsCar Championship for Chip Ganassi Racing. He is the son of the 1978 National Dutch Rallycross Champion Ronald van der Zande. In 2016, Van der Zande won his first major sports car championship with co-driver Alex Popow and Starworks Motorsport in the WeatherTech SportsCar Championship PC Class. Renger resides in Amsterdam with his partner Carlijn and their daughter.

Career

Having won the 2005 Formula Renault 2000 Netherlands championship with Van Amersfoort Racing, Van der Zande drove three races for the A1GP Netherlands team in the 2006–07 season. He raced for the Prema Powerteam in the Formula Three Euroseries in 2007 and 2008, and made his GP2 Series début by competing in the second round of the 2008–09 GP2 Asia Series season for Trust Team Arden, where he replaced Mika Mäki. However, he was himself replaced by Euroseries rival Edoardo Mortara for the third round in Bahrain.

Having not acquired the budget for a GP2 campaign, Van der Zande moved into the British Formula 3 Championship, competing for Hitech Racing. On his debut, he won the first race at Silverstone. He returned to the Euroseries midway through the season, as Atte Mustonen had to pull out of the Oschersleben rounds due to health problems. He returned in Barcelona, again replacing Mustonen at Motopark. This was due to the fact that Daniel Ricciardo had sealed the 2009 British F3 title, before the final round. Hitech teammate Walter Grubmüller overhauled his points tally, and finished as runner-up in the title race. After scoring a point in the first race in Barcelona, Van der Zande won the second race from pole position.

In 2010, Van der Zande joined RSC Mücke Motorsport for the debut season of the GP3 series, the feeder series for the GP2 Series, earning one podium finish. The Dutch driver also competed in the Windsor Arch F3 Macau Grand Prix with Team Motopark Academy, finishing 5th.

From GP3, Van der Zande advanced to the Deutsche Tourenwagen Masters in 2011 with Persson Motorsport, earning a third-place finish at the Munich Olympic Stadium event. From there, he continued his journey in sports cars for 2012, joining Konrad Motorsport for the first two rounds of the Porsche Supercup at Bahrain. That year, he also joined the Lotus LMP2 team in the FIAWEC for two rounds, qualifying 5th at the 6 Hours of Spa-Francorchamps.

The 2013 was a busy one for Van der Zande. He competed in six races in the American Le Mans Series LMPC class with Mishumotors, earning one pole position and one podium. He also competed in the 16 race BRL-V6 season with Teunissen Racing, winning the championship with six race wins and four pole positions. He also competed in select events in the International GT Open with Seyffarth Motorsport in the Mercedes SLS AMG, earning two wins, one pole, and three podiums. That year, he also raced in the Macau GT Cup with Erebus Motorsport, getting as high as third before contact ended his run early.

Van der Zande expanded his racing career to America for the 2014 TUDOR United Sportscar Championship race season, joining Starworks Motorsports with Mirco Schultis. The duo earned wins at Mazda Raceway Laguna Seca, Road America, and Petit Le Mans, and earned an additional four podiums. In Europe, he finished first at the 12 Hours of Zandvoort with Car Collection in the Mercedes-Benz SLS, and also competed GT Masters Nürburgring for HTP Motorsport, and the Macau GT Cup with AMG Driving Academy.

For 2015, Van der Zande returned to American sports car racing with Starworks Motorsports and co-driver Mirco Scultis in the IMSA PC class. The duo finished 5th in the TUDOR United Sportscar Championship PC class after winning at Detroit and Watkins Glen. He also joined EFFORT Racing for the Pirelli World Challenge Grand Prix of Sonoma, filling in for full-time driver Ryan Dalziel. Van der Zande earned the Race 1 pole position and earned the win in Race 2. Near the end of the season, Van der Zande participated in the 24H Barcelona Trofeu Fermi Vélez, earning the pole position in the #5 Car Collection Motorsport Mercedes-Benz SLS AMG.

In 2016, Van der Zande joined forces with Starworks Motorsport for a third year, racing with co-driver Alex Popow. After winning Detroit, Watkins Glen, Lime Rock Park and Austin, the pair earned the IMSA WeatherTech SportsCar Championship PC class championship in the final race of the season at Petit Le Mans. He also competed in the Blancpain GT Series, finishing second at Spa-Franchorchamps, and also second at the Nürburgring 24 Hour.

In November 2016, it was announced Van der Zande would advance to the IMSA WeatherTech SportsCar Championship Prototype class for 2017 with Visit Florida Racing, and with Marc Goossens as his co-driver.

For the 2019 edition of the 24 hours of Daytona, Van der Zande teamed up with Jordan Taylor, Fernando Alonso and Kamui Kobayashi.

In 2020, Van der Zande stayed with Wayne Taylor Racing for a third full season in the team's No. 10 car. He won Petit Le Mans with the team after two leaders took each other out in the closing minutes of the race. After being told by the team in August he would be retained for a fourth season, Van der Zande was informed by the team of his release on October 21.

In 2021, Van der Zande will race in the Chip Ganassi Racing Cadillac DPi-V.R alongside Kevin Magnussen, as well as in the Oreca 07 of Inter Europol Competition in the World Endurance Championship alongside Alex Brundle and Jakub Śmiechowski.

Racing record

Career summary

‡ Team standings.
† – Guest driver; ineligible for championship points

Complete A1 Grand Prix results
(key) (Races in bold indicate pole position) (Races in italics indicate fastest lap)

Complete Formula 3 Euro Series results
(key)

† Guest driver; ineligible for points

Complete GP3 Series results
(key) (Races in bold indicate pole position) (Races in italics indicate fastest lap)

Complete DTM results
(key) (Races in bold indicate pole position) (Races in italics indicate fastest lap)

Complete Porsche Supercup results
(key) (Races in bold indicate pole position) (Races in italics indicate fastest lap)

Complete FIA World Endurance Championship results
(key) (Races in bold indicate pole position; races in italics indicate fastest lap)

American Le Mans Series results
(key) (Races in bold indicate pole position) (Races in italics indicate fastest lap)

Complete IMSA SportsCar Championship results
(key) (Races in bold indicate pole position) (Races in italics indicate fastest lap)

Complete 24 Hours of Le Mans results

Complete European Le Mans Series results
(key) (Races in bold indicate pole position; results in italics indicate fastest lap)

Complete NASCAR results

Whelen Euro Series – Elite 1

References

External links

 

1986 births
Living people
People from Neder-Betuwe
Dutch racing drivers
German Formula Renault 2.0 drivers
Dutch Formula Renault 2.0 drivers
Nordic Formula Renault 2.0 drivers
A1 Team Netherlands drivers
Formula 3 Euro Series drivers
British Formula Three Championship drivers
GP2 Asia Series drivers
Dutch GP3 Series drivers
Deutsche Tourenwagen Masters drivers
Porsche Supercup drivers
FIA World Endurance Championship drivers
International GT Open drivers
24 Hours of Daytona drivers
WeatherTech SportsCar Championship drivers
ADAC GT Masters drivers
NASCAR drivers
24 Hours of Le Mans drivers
24 Hours of Spa drivers
Prema Powerteam drivers
Arden International drivers
Chip Ganassi Racing drivers
GT World Challenge America drivers
Karting World Championship drivers
German Formula Three Championship drivers
European Le Mans Series drivers
Van Amersfoort Racing drivers
A1 Grand Prix drivers
Hitech Grand Prix drivers
Motopark Academy drivers
Double R Racing drivers
Mücke Motorsport drivers
Kolles Racing drivers
DragonSpeed drivers
Starworks Motorsport drivers
Rowe Racing drivers
Wayne Taylor Racing drivers
Mercedes-AMG Motorsport drivers
Sportspeople from Gelderland
Nürburgring 24 Hours drivers
24H Series drivers